London overspill communities are the communities created as a result of the government policy of moving residents out of Greater London into other areas in the South East of England between the 1930s and the 1970s. These largely consisted of council houses and new towns.

Policy development
The policy was instigated in the 1930s, but started in earnest after the Second World War, as a reaction to the housing shortages caused by enemy bombing and large amounts of substandard housing in the capital. This policy existed until the late 1970s, reinforced by a widespread dislike of ribbon development. Started by the London County Council, the task was completed by its successor, the Greater London Council. In the 1960s, the Location of Offices Bureau dispersed office workers away from the capital. In 1960, the Greater London Plan proposed that over one million Londoners should be relocated from Inner London. The great majority of overspill families were relocated either to existing or new towns within south east England. As a short term expedient, viewed as regrettable, to meet an urgent need, "quasi-satellites" were created around the edge of Greater London, or close by, at South Oxhey, Debden and Harold Hill.

List of new and expanded towns
In 1973, the following towns were listed, in Hansard, as London overspill:

See also
 Overspill estate
 Niethrop and Bretch hill, Banbury
 Ruscote and Hardwick, Banbury

References

Housing in London
Town and country planning in England
Social history of London
New towns in England
Town and country planning in London